John Robert Jones (4 September 1911 – 3 June 1970), was a Welsh philosopher.

He was born in Pwllheli, and went to school there before going on to study philosophy at University of Wales, Aberystwyth in 1929.  He went on to take his D.Phil. at Balliol College, Oxford.  He returned to Aberystwyth to lecture in philosophy, and in 1952 was appointed Professor of Philosophy at University of Wales, Swansea.  In 1961 he was visiting professor at Chapel Hill University, North Carolina.  On his return to Wales, he became more politically active, speaking out against the investiture of Charles, Prince of Wales, in 1969, resigning from the Gorsedd of Bards in protest.

As a philosopher, he was influenced by Wittgenstein and Simone Weil.  His writings dealt mainly with three problems: the nature of the self, the nature of perception, and the nature of universals.

Works
Yr Argyfwng Gwacter Ystyr (1964)
Prydeindod (1966)
A rhaid i'r iaith ein gwahanu? (1967)
Ni fyn y taeog mo'i ryddhau (1968)
Yr ewyllys i barhau (1969)
Gwaedd yng Nghymru (1970)
Ac Onide (1970)

References

1911 births
1970 deaths
People from Gwynedd
Welsh philosophers
20th-century British philosophers
20th-century Welsh writers
20th-century Welsh educators